Hayden Paddon (born 20 April 1987) is a New Zealand rally driver. He was PWRC world champion in 2011 and won the New Zealand Rally Championship in 2008, 2009, 2013, 2018 and 2021.

Career

Paddon was introduced into motorsport at an early age, his father Chris being a rally driver, beginning his career competing in karting. He competed in his first rally in 2002, at the age of 15. In 2005, he rolled and burnt his car in Rally Canterbury 2005. In 2006 he began competing in the New Zealand Rally Championship in a Mitsubishi Lancer Evolution VIII, winning both the Junior and Rookie titles. In 2007 he made his World Rally Championship debut competing in the Production World Rally Championship category at his home event in New Zealand as a wildcard entry, and then in the Team Jordan entry for Rally GB. In the New Zealand championship he retained his Junior title and came within a point of winning the championship outright. In 2008 he competed in a new Mitsubishi Evo IX, winning the New Zealand title. He also finished 13th overall and fourth in PWRC on his home round of the WRC.

In 2009 he retained his New Zealand title, won the Pacific Cup, and also qualified for the Pirelli Star Driver Asia-Pacific final at the 2009 Rally Australia. Paddon was the fastest of the drivers on the opening day's stages, meaning he won the Pirelli Star Driver scholarship, giving him a fully funded programme for six events of the 2010 World Rally Championship season. Paddon's event got even better when he finished ninth overall, ahead of all of the PWRC regulars. Paddon also won a $50,000 International Rising Stars Scholarship run by Rally of New Zealand, giving him the additional funding needed to complete a full 2010 PWRC campaign in addition to the PSD events.

In 2010, Paddon won the PWRC category of Rally New Zealand in his own Evo IX, finishing 14th overall. He then finished third and second in PWRC on Rally Finland and Rallye Deutschland in the Pirelli Star Driver Evo X.

In 2011, Paddon contested a full PWRC season, consisting of 6 Rounds; Portugal, Argentina, Finland, Australia, Spain and GB. He competed under his newly formed team New Zealand World Rally Team and in a surprising move, Paddon switched to a Subaru for the 2011 season, as he had usually run in a Mitsubishi. Paddon drove a STR11 Subaru Impreza N4 run by Belgian Team Symtech Racing. Paddon's 2011 season proved to be a breakthrough as he took 1st place in four rallies consecutively: Portugal, Argentina, Finland and Australia, where he became 2011 P-WRC Champion.

The 2012 season saw Paddon move to the S-WRC championship in a Škoda Fabia S2000. After a 4th place among the S-WRC finishers in Sweden, he took his first S-WRC win in his second rally in the car at 2012 Rally de Portugal, which saw many competitors, including Paddon, have breakdowns.

2014 saw Paddon's first stage win in the World Rally Championship during the Rally Catalunya in Spain.

In 2015, Paddon took his first ever lead of a WRC event in the Rally d'Italia. Paddon was the first New Zealander to lead a World Rally Championship event since Possum Bourne held the lead in the 1999 Rally New Zealand and the first one to do so outside of his country. He finished second overall, behind Sébastien Ogier, after a careful performance and many stage wins.

In 2016, on the 4th round, the YPF Rally Argentina, Paddon took his - and New Zealand's - first WRC win by 13.3 seconds from Sébastien Ogier. His co-driver, John Kennard also became the oldest co-driver to win a WRC round at 57 years of age. Notably and perhaps controversially he celebrated the victory with a black and silver fern flag rather than the flag of New Zealand, following the failed flag referendum held earlier in the year. His intent was to distinguish the New Zealand flag from the Australian flag, where confusions still exists, even when, at the time of the victory, he was not competing against Australian drivers or co-drivers.

In the first rally of 2017, the 2017 Monte Carlo Rally, Paddon crashed out on the first stage, losing control of his Hyundai. A spectator was killed in the incident having been hit by the right rear of Paddon's car. Although Paddon's car was not severely damaged and could have continued, the Hyundai team withdrew Paddon from the rally as a mark of respect. Prior to round 6 in Portugal, Paddon's long-time co-driver John Kennard decided to retire through injury, and he was replaced by Briton Sebastian Marshall. Overall, Paddon endured a frustrating season, picking up just two podiums in Poland and Australia. He led round 7 in Italy, until retiring late on day 2 after hitting a bank and breaking his right rear suspension.

In October 2020. Hayden Paddon and Hyundai New Zealand reveals one of the worlds first EV rally cars, based on the Hyundai Kona.

In March 2022, Hayden Paddon teamed up with Hyundai New Zealand to enter a car into WRC2. The car will be run by Hyundai New Zealand Rally, with the previously established team of engineers, technician and team management.

Paddon both organised and won the 2020 inaugural Ben Nevis Station Golden 1200 hillclimbing event in Central Otago, where he was driving a specially prepared Hyundai i20 called the AP4++ with a custom 2.1L turbo 4 cylinder engine making 800 hp.

WRC victories

Results

WRC results

* Season still in progress.

PWRC results

SWRC results

WRC-2 results

WRC-2 Pro results

European Rally Championship results

References

External links

Official website
Paddon Rallysport

Living people
1987 births
New Zealand rally drivers
World Rally Championship drivers
European Rally Championship drivers
Hyundai Motorsport drivers
M-Sport drivers